Aguiaria is a monotypic genus of flowering plants belonging to the family Malvaceae.

Its native range is Northern Brazil.

The genus was named after Brás de Aguiar (1881–1947), Brazilian naval officer who supported the author of the genus, Adolpho Ducke.

It has one species, Aguiaria excelsa  which was first published and described in Ann. Acad. Brasil. Sci. Vol.7 on page 329 in 1935.

References

Malvaceae
Malvaceae genera
Plants described in 1935
Taxa named by Adolpho Ducke